By the Shortest of Heads was a 1915 British film starring George Formby as a stableboy who outwits a gang of villains. It was Formby's first film; he was aged ten at the time. The film is now considered lost, with the last-known copy having been destroyed in 1940.

Plot
Formby played a stable boy who outwits a gang of villains and wins a £10,000 prize when he comes first in a horse race.

Cast
 George Formby as Tony Dawson
 Jack Tessier as Eric Dawson
 Moore Marriott as Captain Fields
 Jack Hulcup as Geoffrey Warrington
 Percy Manton as Squire Markham

Background

George Formby Snr was worried that his son, George Formby, would watch him on stage and begin a career on stage; he was against the boy following in his footsteps, saying "one fool in the family is enough". In 1915 Formby Snr allowed his son to appear on screen, taking the lead in By the Shortest of Heads. After completing the filming, Formby Jnr was sent to Ireland to continue his jockey training, as were the five horses Formby had purchased that year, which joined others he had previously bought.

The film is now considered lost, with the last-known copy having been destroyed in 1940.

References

Sources

External links

1915 films
British silent feature films
British comedy films
Films directed by Bert Haldane
1915 comedy films
British black-and-white films
Lost British films
1915 lost films
Lost comedy films
1910s English-language films
1910s British films
Silent comedy films